The Journal of Contemporary African Studies is a research journal on human science study of Africa.

The journal was originally published biannually, later changing to quarterly. It is interdisciplinary in nature, with a focus on human sciences.

It is hosted in Rhodes University, South Africa. The chief editor is Kirk Helliker.

References 

African studies journals
Publications established in 1981
English-language journals
Quarterly journals
Routledge academic journals

External links 
 Website